HMAS Waterhen (D22/I22) was a W-class destroyer that served in the Royal Navy (as HMS Waterhen (G28/D22)) and the Royal Australian Navy (RAN). Built during World War I, the destroyer was completed in mid 1918, and commissioned into the Royal Navy. In 1933, Waterhen and four other British ships were transferred to the RAN. The ship's early RAN career was uneventful, with periods spent decommissioned in reserve, but she was reactivated in September 1939, and deployed to the Mediterranean as part of the Australian destroyer force: the Scrap Iron Flotilla. During her time in the Mediterranean, Waterhen was involved in escort and patrol duties, performed shore bombardments, and participated in Allied evacuations from Greece and Crete. On 29 June 1941, while operating with the Tobruk Ferry Service, Waterhen was heavily damaged by Axis aircraft. Attempts to tow the ship to port were unsuccessful, and she sank on 30 June 1941, the first RAN ship lost to combat in World War II.

Design and construction
Propulsion machinery consisted of three Yarrow boilers feeding two Brown-Curtis turbines, which provided  to the two propeller shafts. The ship's company consisted of 6 officers and 113 sailors.

At launch, Waterhens main armament consisted of four single QF  Mark V guns. This was supplemented by a quad-barelled QF 2-pounder naval gun, and five .303 inch machine guns of various types. The destroyer was also fitted with two 3-tube  torpedo sets, two depth charge chutes, and four depth charge throwers. Later modifications to her armament included the installation of a second 2-pounder gun, and the replacement of the torpedo tube sets with two 4-tube sets.

Waterhen was laid down by Palmers Shipbuilding and Iron Company at their shipyard in Hebburn-on-Tyne on 3 July 1917. She was launched on 26 March 1918. The destroyer was completed on 17 July 1918, and was commissioned into the Royal Navy.

Operational history

Transfer to RAN
In 1933, the British Admiralty decided to replace five  destroyers on loan to the RAN with five more capable (but slightly older) destroyers. Waterhen was one of the five ships selected, and was commissioned into the RAN at Portsmouth on 11 October 1933. The ships arrived in Australia on 21 December 1933. Waterhen was paid off into reserve on 9 October 1934 but recommissioned on 14 April 1936. She was decommissioned again on 1 June 1938, and returned to service between 29 September and 10 November 1938.

World War II
With war in Europe looming, Waterhen was recommissioned on 1 September 1939. On 14 November, Waterhen sailed to Singapore, then after rendezvousing with the rest of the Australian Destroyer Flotilla (referred to as the "Scrap Iron Flotilla" by German propagandists), headed for the Mediterranean. While en route, Waterhen detached to participate in the unsuccessful hunt for the German warship . During the early part of her Mediterranean deployment, Waterhen was involved in convoy escort and anti-submarine patrols, but these were mostly uneventful until Italy entered the war in August 1940.

On 17 August, the destroyer performed shore bombardments of the Libyan coast. On 21 August, they did the same at Bardia. In October, Waterhen escorted supply ships to Crete, where a forward base was being set up to assist in the Allied reinforcement of Greece. On 25 December, the ship captured the Italian sailing vessel Tireremo Diritto. On 30 December, Waterhen unintentionally rammed and sank the anti-submarine trawler , and was forced to dock for repairs. In April, Waterhen became involved in Allied evacuations from Greece and Crete. After this, she was assigned to the Tobruk Ferry Service; supply runs to the Allied force besieged at Tobruk.

Loss
The attack heavily damaged the Australian destroyer (although the only casualty was a wound from a flying can of bully beef); Waterhen was hit in the stern by a single  bomb dropped by the Ju 87 piloted by Maresciallo Ennio Tarantola (239th Dive Bombing Squadron, Regia Aeronautica), which caused the immediate flooding of the engine and boiler rooms. Defender took Waterhen in tow, but at 13:50 on 30 June 1941, the destroyer rolled over and sank. She was the first ship of the Royal Australian Navy to be lost by enemy action in World War II.

The ship earned three battle honours for her wartime service: "Libya 1941", "Greece 1941", and "Crete 1941".

Citations

References

Further reading

External links

V and W-class destroyers of the Royal Navy
Ships built on the River Tyne
1918 ships
World War I destroyers of the United Kingdom
V and W-class destroyers of the Royal Australian Navy
World War II destroyers of Australia
Destroyers sunk by aircraft
World War II shipwrecks in the Mediterranean Sea
Maritime incidents in June 1941
Ships sunk by Italian aircraft